Toonpan is a locality in the City of Townsville, Queensland, Australia.

History 
During World War II, the 29th Brigade of the Australian Army was based in Toonpan from May to September 1942. After September it moved to the Black River area, north of Townsville, before going to Papua New Guinea in January 1943.

The locality was named and bounded on 27 July 1991.

References 

City of Townsville
Localities in Queensland
3 Personal history of William Harold Mann of 29 Brigade